Luke Cameron Russe is an English professional footballer who plays as a defensive midfielder for Chippenham Town.

Career

Bristol Rovers 
Russe began his career in the youth academy at Bristol Rovers at Under-10 level. In July 2017, he joined the first team during a pre-season camp in Portugal.

On 29 August 2017, he made his professional debut replacing Byron Moore in the 71st minute of a 5–1 EFL Trophy victory against Wycombe Wanderers. On 31 October, he played the full 90 minutes in a 3–1 defeat to West Ham United Under-23s in the same competition. He made his league debut for the club when on 3 March 2018, he started in a 1–0 away victory to MK Dons before being replaced by Ryan Sweeney in the 75th minute of the game. He went on to make two more league appearances that season, coming off the bench against Fleetwood Town and Southend United.

Russe appeared in all 3 of the EFL Trophy group matches coming off the bench against West Ham Under-23s and Yeovil Town before playing the full 90 minutes against Exeter City.

Gloucester City (loan)
On 25 January 2019, Russe joined Gloucester City on a one-month loan deal. Russe made his debut the following day in a 0–0 home draw to Bath City where he played the full match. On 21 February, Russe extended his loan deal until the end of the season.

Chippenham Town (loan)
In January 2020 he joined Chippenham Town on loan.

Chippenham Town
On 3 August 2020, Russe joined Chippenham Town on a permanent deal. He made his debut on 3 October 2020 as Chippenham beat Poole Town on penalties after drawing 2-2 in the FA Cup, a game that saw Russe score his penalty in the shootout.

Career statistics

References 

1999 births
Living people
English footballers
Bristol Rovers F.C. players
Association football midfielders
Gloucester City A.F.C. players
Chippenham Town F.C. players
English Football League players
National League (English football) players